Bromus catharticus is a species of brome grass known by the common names rescuegrass, grazing brome, prairie grass, and Schrader's bromegrass. The specific epithet catharticus is Latin, meaning cathartic. The common name rescuegrass refers to the ability of the grass to provide forage after harsh droughts or severe winters. The grass has a diploid number of 42.

It is native to South America but it can be found in other places, including Europe, Australia and North America, as an introduced species.

Description

Bromus catharticus is a coarse winter annual or biennial grass, growing  in height. The sheaths are densely hairy. The upper spikelets are erect and the lower spikelets are nodding or drooping. The glumes are smooth or occasionally slightly scabrous. The lemmas are scabrous or nearly glabrous and lack awns or possess very short awns  in length. The palea is over half the length of the lemma.

Habitat

Bromus catharticus grows in open and disturbed areas.

References

External links
Jepson Manual Treatment (invasive species)
USDA Plants Profile
UC CalPhotos gallery

catharticus
Grasses of South America
Taxa named by Martin Vahl